Ekaterina Aleksandrovna Klimova (born January 24, 1978) is a Russian film, theater and TV actress, who started her career in 1999. In 2002, she received the Viktor Rozov Award for the Best Actress Under Age 30. One of her notable roles is Dutchess Natalia Repnina in 2003 television series Poor Nastya.

Biography 
Klimova was born in Moscow, Russian SFSR, Soviet Union (now Russia). After high school, Catherine entered the preparatory courses in the Russian State Institute of VGIK. She graduated from the Mikhail Shchepkin Higher Theatre School with honors in 1999 (acting department, workshop of Nikolai Afonin).

Personal life 
First husband —  Ilya Khoroshilov jeweler with whom Klimova had met while still a schoolgirl. The couple divorced in 2004. Daughter Liza Khoroshilova (born 2002).

Second husband —  In 2004, she married Igor Petrenko. They have two sons together —  Matvey Petrenko (born 2006) and Korney Petrenko (born 2008). Petrenko and Klimova divorced on July 10, 2014.

Third husband —  on June 5, 2015, Ekaterina married a Russian actor Gela Meskhi, with whom she lived for some time in a civil marriage. They have one child together —  daughter Bella Meskhi (born October 2015). They divorced on June 28, 2019.

Selected filmography

Television
  (Russia, 2001) as Raisa
  (Russia, 2001) as Inna Gavrushina
  (Russia, 2001) as prodavshchitsa na rynke
  (Russia, 2001) as Sinya
  (Russia, 2001) as Katja
  (Russia, 2001)
  (English title: Poor Nastya) (Russia, USA 2003–2004) as Natalia Alexandrovna Repnina
  (Russia, 2004) as Katya Androsova
  (Russia, 2005) as Julija Blohina
  (English title: The Storm Gate) (Russia, 2006) as Alina
  (Russia, 2006) as Katja
  (Russia, 2008) as Svetlana
  (Russia, 2008) as Inessa
  (Russia, 2010)
  (Russia, 2008) as Svetlana
  (Russia, 2010)
  (Russia, 2010) as Dasha Korshunova
  (Russia, 2010)
  (Ukraine, 2011)
  (Russia, 2011)
  (Russia, Ukraine 2011) as Evgenija Shchegoleva
 Grigoriy R. (Russia, 2014)
 Under Military Law (Russia, 2016) as Svetlana Yelagina 
 You All Infuriate Me (Russia, 2017)

Films
 Poisons or the World History of Poisoning (Яды, или Всемирная история отравлений, 2001) as Jeanne d'Albret
  (Russia, 2003) as Tanya
  (English title: And in the Morning They Woke Up)(Russia, 2003) as Ket
  (Russia, 2005) as Sasha
  (English title: Black Hunters) (Russia, 2008) as Nurse Nina
  (Russia, 2005) as kapitan Bahteeva
  (Ukraine, 2008)
  (Russia, 2009) as Katja
  (Ukraine, 2009)
  (Russia, 2010) as Tatiana
  (English title: Black Hunters 2) (Russia, 2010) as Nurse Nina
  (Russia, 2010) as Anna Svetlova
 Fairytale.Is (Russia, 2011) as mama
 Love in Vegas (Russia-Ukraine, 2014) as Anna
  as Kseniya Lastochkina (2017)
 Little Red Riding Hood (2022)

Herself
Muz-TV Awards (Russia, 2006) as herself

Awards 
Viktor Rozov Award "Crystal Rose" (2000) - Best Actress Under Age 30 for the role of Desdemona in theatre play Otello
Medal "For strengthening military cooperation" (Ministry of Defence - 2008) - for role in the film "Second Wind"
Annual award "Couple of the Year", nominated for "Harmony" (with Igor Petrenko, 2010)

References

External links 

 Kino-teatr.ru
 Kinopoisk.ru
 Ruskino.ru
 Kinomania.ru

1978 births
Living people
Russian film actresses
Russian television actresses
Russian stage actresses
Actresses from Moscow
21st-century Russian actresses